Vesna Fabjan (born 13 March 1985) is a Slovenian cross-country skier who has competed since 2001. Competing in three Winter Olympics, her best finish is third in the individual sprint event at Sochi in 2014.

Fabjan's best finish at the FIS Nordic World Ski Championships was fourth in the individual sprint in Oslo in 2011.
She finished ninth in the team sprint event in Sapporo in 2007.

Her two World Cup victories were achieved at a sprint freestyle event in Russia in January 2010 and February 2011.

Fabjan finished third in the individual sprint to win bronze at the Sochi 2014 Winter Olympic Games.

In June 2020, she announced her retirement.

Cross-country skiing results
All results are sourced from the International Ski Federation (FIS).

Olympic Games
 1 medal – (1 bronze)

World Championships

World Cup

Individual podiums
 2 victories – (2 ) 
 5 podiums – (5 )

Team podiums
 1 podium – (1 )

References

External links 

 
 
 

1985 births
Cross-country skiers at the 2006 Winter Olympics
Cross-country skiers at the 2010 Winter Olympics
Cross-country skiers at the 2014 Winter Olympics
Cross-country skiers at the 2018 Winter Olympics
Living people
Olympic cross-country skiers of Slovenia
Sportspeople from Kranj
Slovenian female cross-country skiers
Olympic bronze medalists for Slovenia
Medalists at the 2014 Winter Olympics
Olympic medalists in cross-country skiing
Universiade medalists in cross-country skiing
Universiade gold medalists for Slovenia
Competitors at the 2005 Winter Universiade